Harry Gough may refer to: 

 Harry Gough (1681–1751), chairman of the East India Company
 Sir Henry Gough, 1st Baronet (1709–1774), his brother, also known as Sir Harry
 Sir Henry Gough (1649–1724) of Perry Hall, their father, also known as Sir Harry
 Harry Dorsey Gough (1745–1808), American relative, merchant, planter, and Methodist preacher
 Harold Gough (1890–1970), British soccer player, also known as Harry

See also
 Henry Gough (disambiguation)